The 2018 European Marathon Cup was the 11th edition of the European Marathon Cup of athletics and were held in Berlin, Germany on 12 August, inside of the 2018 European Championships.

The total time is calculated on the sum of the times of the first three athletes arrived at the finish line, but the medals are awarded to all the athletes who have concluded the race.

Results

References

External links
 EAA web site

European Marathon Cup
Marathon Cup
International athletics competitions hosted by Germany
Marathons in Germany
European
Marathon Cup
European Marathon Cup